The Battle of Đồng Hới was a clash between United States Navy warships and Vietnam People's Air Force (VPAF) MiG-17F fighter bombers, several torpedo boats and shore batteries on April 19, 1972, during the Vietnam War. This was the first time U.S. warships faced an air attack since the end of World War II.

The Battle for Đồng Hới Gulf involved fierce firefights when Navy ships attempted to stop North Vietnamese troops and supplies transiting the coast highway in North Vietnam from reaching the battle front in Quảng Trị Province. The air raid described here marked the end of daylight raids by the Navy. Within a few weeks, however, all North Vietnamese resistance at Đồng Hới was suppressed.

Battle

The American warships operating in the Gulf of Tonkin were shelling North Vietnamese coastal targets around Đồng Hới, Quảng Bình Province, North Central Coast region near the DMZ along the 17th parallel, the provisional borderline between South Vietnam and North Vietnam when they were attacked by VPAF MiGs in the first air attack on U.S. naval forces in the Vietnam War.

At approximately 17:00, USS Sterett detected three hostile aircraft approaching the navy ships. One of the MiG-17s scored a direct hit on USS Higbee with a BETAB-250 bomb, after failing to hit its target twice on two previous attack runs. The explosion destroyed the aft  gun mount which was empty, as the 12-man crew had been evacuated following a "hang fire" (a round stuck in one of the barrels). Another MiG-17 simultaneously aimed its bombs at USS Oklahoma City but missed the target. The U.S. claims that one of the MiGs was shot down by a Terrier surface-to-air missile from USS Sterett. One more MiG disappeared from Steretts radar along with a Terrier missile fired at it from the frigate, indicating a probable kill. A North Vietnamese Styx anti-ship missile was alleged to have been fired and intercepted, but this was not confirmed by official documentation.

At approximately 18:00 as the US ships withdrew to the northeast, USS Sterett detected two surface targets shadowing the US ships, after 30 minutes, Sterett opened fire on the targets with its 5-inch (127 mm) gun destroying the two suspected North Vietnamese P 6-class torpedo boats.

Aftermath

The North Vietnamese claimed the sortie involved two MiG-17s piloted by Lê Xuân Dị and Nguyễn Văn Bảy "B", both of which returned safely to their base, and that the North Vietnamese navy had not participated in any engagement until August 27. The attack crippled Higbees 5-inch (127 mm) gun turret, impaired its steering and propulsion, and wounded 4 sailors on deck. Oklahoma City only sustained minor damage on its stern. The U.S. later responded by bombardment against Vinh and Đồng Hới on April 19 and 20, and an air strike by 33 aircraft on April 22 at the Khe Gát Airfield, from which the attacking MiG-17s had taken off, destroying one MiG and damaging another on the ground.

Although the losses inflicted were superficial, the North Vietnamese attack had forced the Americans to employ more of their strength to prevent future incidents against the background of downscaling U.S. military activities in the area.

Notes

References

External links
Analysis of the Battle of Dong Hoi by Stuart Slade. Updated 20 June 1999
Visiting Vietnam’s War Battlefields: Dong Hoi, North Vietnam. 

Conflicts in 1972
1972 in Vietnam
1972 in the United States
Dong Hoi
History of Quảng Bình Province
Dong Hoi
Dong Hoi
Battles and operations of the Vietnam War in 1972
April 1972 events in Asia